Nikolay Kovalev may refer to:

 Nikolay Kovalyov (politician) (1949–2019), Russian politician
 Nikolay Kovalev (fencer) (born 1986), Russian sabre fencer